The Greco-Roman lightweight competition at the 1912 Summer Olympics was part of the wrestling programme.

The competition used a form of double-elimination tournament.  Rather than using the brackets that are now standard for double-elimination contests (and which assure that each match is between two competitors with the same number of losses), each wrestler drew a number.  Each man would face off against the wrestler with the next number, provided he had not already faced that wrestler and that the wrestler was not from the same nation as him (unless this was necessary to avoid byes).

When only three wrestlers remain (the medalists), the double-elimination halts and a special final round is used to determine the order of the medals.

Results

First round

48 wrestlers began the competition.

Second round

Arthur Gould and Árpád Szántó withdrew after their first round losses.  46 wrestlers started the second round, 24 with no losses and 22 with one.

16 were eliminated.  6 survived potential elimination (5 by eliminating another wrestler, 1 by giving a previously undefeated wrestler his first loss).  7 received their first loss, while 17 remained undefeated.

Third round

Paul Tirkkonen and Bror Flygare abandoned the contest after their first losses in round 2. 28 wrestlers started the third round, 17 with no losses and 11 with one.

6 were eliminated.  5 survived potential elimination (2 by eliminating another wrestler, 3 by giving a previously undefeated wrestler his first loss).  8 received their first loss, while 9 remained undefeated.

Fourth round

22 wrestlers started the fourth round, 9 with no losses and 13 with one.

6 were eliminated.  7 survived potential elimination (4 by eliminating another wrestler, 3 by giving a previously undefeated wrestler his first loss).  5 received their first loss, while 4 remained undefeated.

Fifth round

Otto Laitinen withdrew after his first loss, in round four.

15 wrestlers started the fifth round, 4 with no losses and 11 with one.  The round exhibited a set-up slightly peculiar for the format, in that every match was symmetrical in terms of number of losses for each wrestler.  2 matches were between pairs of undefeated men, while 5 matches were between pairs of wrestlers both facing elimination.  There were no matches between an undefeated wrestler and one with one loss.

Unsurprisingly, given that, 5 men were eliminated and 5 survived potential elimination, with a sixth advancing with one loss due to a bye.  2 received their first loss, while 2 remained undefeated.

Sixth round

10 wrestlers started the fifth round, 2 with no losses and 8 with one.

The two remaining undefeated wrestlers, Väre and Malmström, faced off, with Väre coming out the better.  The other four matches were all between two men facing elimination, and so the winners of those four matches were expected to join Malmström in moving to the seventh round with one loss while the losers were out.  The match between Kaplur and Kolehmainen, however, resulted in both wrestlers disqualified, so only 5 wrestlers moved on.

Seventh round

5 wrestlers started the fifth round, 1 with no losses and 4 with one.  The match between Lund and Radvány resulted in both wrestlers disqualified, pulling the round to a quick halt since there were then remaining only three wrestlers.  Those three moved on to the final round.

Final round

With three wrestlers remaining, all of the previous results were ignored for the final round.

References
 
 

Greco-Roman lightweight